Anne Hurley (born 22 March 1951) is a Canadian basketball player. She competed in the women's tournament at the 1976 Summer Olympics.

References

1951 births
Living people
Canadian women's basketball players
Olympic basketball players of Canada
Basketball players at the 1976 Summer Olympics
Basketball players from Toronto